64P/Swift–Gehrels is a periodic comet in the Solar System which has a current orbital period of 9.23 years.

It was originally discovered on 17 November 1889 by Lewis A. Swift at the Warner Observatory, Rochester, New York, and was described by Swift as being pretty faint. It was rediscovered on 8 February 1973 by Tom Gehrels at the Palomar Observatory, California who estimated its brightness as a very low magnitude 19.

It was also observed in 1981, 1991, 2000, 2009 and 2018. The 2018 apparition was the most favourable, with the comet reaching a peak magnitude of 9. It had its closest approach to the Earth on 28 October 2018, at a distance of 0.445 au. The comet had four outbursts. The brightest was on August 14, during which the comet brightened 2.7 magnitudes.

See also
 List of numbered comets

References 

Periodic comets
0064
Comets in 2018
18891117
19730208